Aiguafreda is a municipality in the comarca of Vallès Oriental, in the province of Barcelona, Catalonia, Spain. It is located near the Montseny massif. It has a population of 2,190 and occupies an area of 7.96 km².

The principal economic activities are tourism and the textile industry.

There is a large dolmen located in the center of the property of can Brull, and the church of Aiguafreda de Dalt, founded by the abbess Emma, daughter of the count  Wilfred the Hairy.

Demography
According to Spanish census data, this is the population of Aiguafreda in recent years.

References

 Panareda Clopés, Josep Maria; Rios Calvet, Jaume; Rabella Vives, Josep Maria (1989). Guia de Catalunya, Barcelona: Caixa de Catalunya.  (Catalan).

External links

Official city website  
 Government data pages 

Municipalities in Vallès Oriental
Populated places in Vallès Oriental